The 6th National Assembly of Laos was elected by a popular vote on 30 April 2006 and was replaced by the 7th National Assembly on 15 June 2011.

Meetings

Officers

Presidency

Vice Presidency

Members

References

Citations

Bibliography
Books:

6th National Assembly of Laos
2006 establishments in Laos
2011 disestablishments in Laos